Marie Storms (born 19 December 1885, date of death unknown) was a Belgian tennis player. She competed at the 1920 Summer Olympics and the 1924 Summer Olympics.

References

External links
 

1885 births
Year of death missing
Belgian female tennis players
Olympic tennis players of Belgium
Tennis players at the 1920 Summer Olympics
Tennis players at the 1924 Summer Olympics
Sportspeople from Hainaut (province)
20th-century Belgian women